Fatehpur Dobra is a village in the Bhopal district of Madhya Pradesh, India. It is located in the Huzur tehsil and the Phanda block. The Radharaman Institute of Technology & Science is located nearby.

In 2012, the Government of Madhya Pradesh allotted a land in this village for the sector headquarters of the Border Security Force.

Demographics 

According to the 2011 census of India, Fatehpur Dobra has 150 households. The effective literacy rate (i.e. the literacy rate of population excluding children aged 6 and below) is 58.41%.

References 

Villages in Huzur tehsil